William Brown (22 August 1900 – 7 January 1985) was an English professional footballer who played in the Football League for West Ham United, Chelsea, Fulham, Stockport County and Hartlepools United.

Career
Brown joined West Ham United, a club he had played for as a 16-year-old during World War I, from Hetton in 1921. He made his debut in the final match of the 1920–21 season, a scoreless away game against South Shields on 7 May 1921.

Brown was often used as a Utility player, but predominantly featured in the inside-forward positions during his Football League career. He played at inside-right, partnering Dick Richards, in the 1923 FA Cup Final against Bolton Wanderers. A month later, he played for England in a reserve international against France. He gained a full cap the following year, scoring in a 2–2 draw against Belgium at The Hawthorns that saw him playing alongside West Ham teammate Ted Hufton.

He made 71 appearances and scored 20 goals for the east London club before leaving for Chelsea in 1924. He went on to play for Fulham, Stockport County and Hartlepools United, where he scored 3 goals in 13 appearances. He saw out his playing days with spells at Annfield Plain and Blackhall Colliery Welfare. He also played cricket for Blackhall, signing on 14 March 1933 and becoming captain of the team. He ended his time with the club when he took on a role as a colliery baths superintendent at Easington Colliery.

References

External links
Billy Brown at England Football Online
Billy Brown at Spartacus Educational

1900 births
1985 deaths
People from Hetton-le-Hole
Footballers from Tyne and Wear
English footballers
England international footballers
Association football inside forwards
Association football utility players
West Ham United F.C. wartime guest players
West Ham United F.C. players
Chelsea F.C. players
Fulham F.C. players
Stockport County F.C. players
Hartlepool United F.C. players
Annfield Plain F.C. players
Blackhall Colliery Welfare F.C. players
English Football League players
FA Cup Final players